"Superstar" (also known as "Rock Star") is a special episode of the British comedy television series The Goodies. Written by The Goodies, with songs and music by Bill Oddie.

Plot
Using the name "Randy Pandy", Bill becomes a superstar who is obsessed with his fame, and Tim and Graeme have to save him from the consequences of his pop stardom

Guest stars
 Barbara Mitchell as "Isabel Chintz" 
 John Peel as the "Host of "Top of the Pops"
 Julian Chagrin as "Maxie Grease"
 The Fred Tomlinson Singers as the "Singing Nuns" and "Mincing Monks"
 Elaine Carr, Frances Pidgeon and Lynn Brotchie as dancers ("Pan's Nuns")

References

 "The Goodies Rule OK" — Robert Ross, Carlton Books Ltd, Sydney, 2006
 "From Fringe to Flying Circus — 'Celebrating a Unique Generation of Comedy 1960-1980'" — Roger Wilmut, Eyre Methuen Ltd, 1980
 "The Goodies Episode Summaries" — Brett Allender
 "The Goodies — Fact File" — Matthew K. Sharp

External links
 

The Goodies (series 3) episodes
1973 British television episodes